Singl ploče (1974–1975) (trans. 7-inch singles (1974–1975)) is a compilation album by Yugoslav rock band Bijelo Dugme, released in 1982.

Background
In early 1982, Bijelo Dugme performed in Innsbruck, Austria, at a manifestation conceptualized as a symbolic passing of the torch whereby the Winter Olympic Games last host city (Innsbruck) makes a handover to the next one (Sarajevo). On their return to Yugoslavia, the band's equipment was seized by the customs, as it was discovered that they had put new equipment into old boxes. The band's record label, Jugoton decided to lend 150,000,000 Yugoslav dinars to Bijelo Dugme, in order to pay the penalty. In order to regain part of the money as soon as possible, Jugoton decided to release two compilation albums, Singl ploče (1974–1975) and Singl ploče (1976–1980).

Track listing

Credits

Bijelo Dugme
Željko Bebek - vocals
Goran Bregović - guitar
Zoran Redžić - bass guitar (tracks: 3, 4, 5, 6, 7, 8, 9, 10, 11, 12)
Jadranko Stanković - bass guitar (tracks: 1, 2)
Ipe Ivandić - drums
Vlado Pravdić - keyboards, arranged by (tracks: 4, 6)

Additional personnel
Nikola Borota - producer (tracks: 1, 2, 5, 6)
Vladimir Mihaljek - producer (tracks: 5, 6, 9, 10)
Neil Harrison - producer (track 11)
Antun Marković - engineer (tracks: 1, 2, 3, 4)
Franjo Berner - engineer (tracks: 5, 6, 9, 10)
Miro Bevc - engineer (tracks: 7, 8, 12)
Peter Henderson - engineer (track 12)
Siniša Škarica - compiled by
Goran Trbuljak - artwork (design)
Vladan Jovanović - artwork (drawing)

References

Singl ploče (1974–1975) at Discogs

External links
Singl ploče (1974–1975) at Discogs

Bijelo Dugme compilation albums
1982 compilation albums
Jugoton compilation albums